A sand box or sand jack is a device used for removing the centering of an arch. Each prop is mounted on a sand box. After the plug is removed, the sand pours from the box, causing the centering to move downwards, diminishing the pressure from the arch, and enabling to ultimately remove it.

References 

Arches and vaults
Sand
Tools